Jacq is a surname.

Angèle Jacq (1937–2021), Breton writer
Christian Jacq (born 1947), French author and Egyptologist
Éliane Jacq (1948–2011), French athlete
Grégoire Jacq (born 1992), French tennis player
Peter Le Jacq (born 1954), Maryknoll priest

See also
Jacq van den Berg (born 1916), Netherlands sailor and olympian
Jacq Firmin Vogelaar
Jacq., taxonomic author abbreviation of Nikolaus Joseph von Jacquin(1727–1817), Dutch-born scientist
J.Jacq., taxonomic author abbreviation of Joseph Franz von Jacquin (1766–1839), Austrian scientist
Jack (surname)
Jacque, given name and surname
Jacques, given name and surname